Sebastian Thomson is a Grammy-nominated musician based in Brooklyn, NY. He is currently the drummer for Baroness, Trans Am, and solo act Publicist.

Early life

Thomson was born in Chaco, Argentina and spent his formative years in Argentina, Brazil, Holland, France and the United States. He got his start drumming while attending St. Andrew's Scots School in Argentina. Thomson attended Bard College and was pursuing a PhD in physics at the University of Maryland when he decided to focus on music full time.

Career

Thomson's drumming career began in Washington, DC with the post-rock band Trans Am, formed with childhood friends Philip Manley and Nathan Means while the three were attending college. Trans Am continues to produce music although the members reside in separate cities.

More recently, Thomson is known for his work as the drummer of metal band Baroness. He joined Baroness in 2013 following a bus accident that resulted in the band's original drummer choosing to retire. The first Baroness album featuring Thomson on drums was Purple, released in 2015. The album's song Shock Me earned Thomson and his bandmates a Grammy Award nomination in 2016. Thomson's second studio album with Baroness is Gold & Grey, released June 14, 2019.

Additionally, Thomson maintains an active solo act, Publicist, in which he mixes live drumming with recorded tracks inspired by rock, acid house, electronic music and Detroit techno. When performing as Publicist, Thomson plays his drum kit in the middle of the dance floor, incorporating a synthesizer and vocoder.

Other past solo and collaborative works include The Frequency, Weird War, and The Fucking Champs.

Thomson's US national television debut took place May 20–23, 2019, when he served as the guest drummer for The 8G Band on Late Night with Seth Meyers.

Thomson is also left handed.

References 

20th-century American drummers
Living people
21st-century American drummers
American male drummers
Year of birth missing (living people)
21st-century American male musicians
20th-century American male musicians